The 2000–01 Stanford Cardinal men's basketball team represented Stanford University in the 2000–01 NCAA Division I men's basketball season. Beginning the season 20–0, the team finished 1st in the Pacific-10 Conference with a 16–2 conference record, 31–3 overall. The Cardinal competed in the 2001 NCAA Division I men's basketball tournament, losing to Maryland 73–87 in the Elite Eight.

Roster

Schedule
 
|-
!colspan=12 style="background:#8C1515; color:white;"| Exhibition

|-
!colspan=12 style="background:#8C1515; color:white;"| Regular season

|-
!colspan=12 style="background:#8C1515;"| NCAA tournament

Schedule Source:

Rankings

*AP does not release post-NCAA Tournament rankings^Coaches did not release a week 2 poll

2001 NBA draft

References

Stanford Cardinal men's basketball seasons
Stanford Cardinal
Stanford
Stanford Cardinal men's basketball
Stanford Cardinal men's basketball